Cape Salinas is the southernmost point of Majorca, used for reference by sailors and navigators.

References

Bibliography

 

Landforms of Mallorca
Salinas